Great Barn is an historic building in the English village of Hoghton, Lancashire. Built in 1692 just west of Hoghton Tower, it is now a Grade I listed building.

Side view

See also
Grade I listed buildings in Lancashire
Listed buildings in Hoghton

References

1692 establishments in England
Grade I listed barns